Qiming Zhang is a distinguished professor of Electrical Engineering and Materials Science and Engineering at Pennsylvania State University. He is also the vice President & CTO at Strategic Polymer Sciences, Inc.

Bibliography

  Large electrocaloric effect in ferroelectric polymers near room temperature,2008,SCIENCE,321,5890,821-823,
  A dielectric polymer with high electric energy density and fast discharge speed,2006,SCIENCE,313,5795,1887-1887
  A dielectric polymer with high electric energy density and fast discharge speed 2006, SCIENCE,313,5785,334-336
  An all-organic composite actuator material with a high dielectric constant,2002,NATURE,419,6904,284-287
  Giant electrostriction and relaxor ferroelectric behavior in electron-irradiated poly(vinylidene fluoride-trifluoroethylene) copolymer, 1998,SCIENCE,280,5372,2101–2104

References

External links
Strategic Polymer Sciences, Inc. - Electroactive Polymer (EAP) - Films - High Energy Density Capacitors - High Strain Actuators

Pennsylvania State University faculty
Living people
Year of birth missing (living people)
Fellows of the American Physical Society